Thomas Purchase also known as Thomas Purchis and Thomas Purchas (1577–1678), was the first English settler to occupy the region of Pejepscot, Maine in what is now Brunswick, Topsham and Harpswell. In 1628 he set up a trading post at the site of Fort Andross to barter with the local Wabanaki Native Americans.

Early life

Thomas Purchase was born in 1577 at Dorchester, Dorset, England to Oliver Purchase and Thomesin (Harris) Purchase.

On August 6, 1613, a fire broke out in Dorchester, burning down 170 homes, setting the impetus for the future colonization movement of Massachusetts that led to the Massachusetts Bay Company. In the years after the first fire, the town was plagued with overpopulation. John White, a Puritan minister, by the time of the next fire in 1622, convinced the people of Dorchester to start a new company and head to the New World. The name of this group of investors was called the Dorchester Company. When the company failed, the original investors where part of the group that formed the Massachusetts Bay Company.

Settling in Maine

Although it is not known in what ship Purchase came to the New World, or the exact date, it is documented that he made a return trip, from England in 1629. He boarded the ship The Lyon (not to be confused with Lyon's Whelp), leaving Bristol England on April 5, along with five other ships, arriving in Salem, Massachusetts. He was 53 years old. 

Purchase was the first English settler in what is now called Brunswick, Maine. Before it was incorporated into a town in 1739, the region was known by the Wabanaki Native Americans as Pejepscot (long, rocky rapids part), encompassing the current towns of Brunswick, Topsham, and Harpswell, Maine.

In 1628, Purchase first settled in Saco, Maine, then settling in Pejepscot. He became acquainted with the value of the land which he afterwards acquired. On June 16, 1632, the Plymouth Company granted a patent to Purchase and his brother in-law George Way.

With this new deed, Purchase set up a trading post, where the natives already had one, to buy and sell goods, mainly salmon, sturgeon and furs on a section of the Androscoggin River known as Pejepscot Falls, adjacent to the Site of Fort Andross.

The location of Thomas Purchase's residence in Brunswick is still a matter of doubt, but it is widely believed that one of his homes, where he cured fish, was located near a space on what is now Water Street in Brunswick, located near Captain Daniel Stone's estate.

On August 22, 1639, he made legal conveyance to John Winthrop, Governor of Massachusetts, of all his land, and put himself under the jurisdiction of that colony.

Throughout his time at Pejepscot, Purchase was a fisherman, hunter, trader and raised cattle. He  bartering with the natives and other settlers with a rich stock of salmon, sturgeon, and shad, as well as wildlife game. Purchase had a monopoly on the area and would cure and pack fish for exportation to London. He was also a farmer cultivating soil and had enough maize to store for the winter.

King Philip's War

In 1675, war with the Native Americans broke out, known as King Philip's War. By September of that year hostilities commenced at Pejepscot. A party of twenty natives went to Purchase's house and pretended to his wife that they wished to trade. Discovering that her husband and son were both absent, they proceeded to rob the house. Purchase's son returned home while this was happening, and fled for his life. The preceding year Purchase's house was burned by the natives.

With the destruction of his home, Purchase lost the only copy of the patent that held his property. The original had been left with Mr. Francis Ashley, in England. Soon after this fire, along with other settlers, he moved to a nearby island where they waited for a ship to take them to Lynn, Massachusetts, where he lived out the rest of his life.

Family and death

Thomas Purchase was married twice. His first wife was Mary Gove. The marriage occurred in 1631 but she died in Boston, on January 7, 1656. His second marriage, in 1657, was to Elizabeth Williams; they had five children together, four daughters and one son. Their children were Thomas Purchase Jr., Jane Purchase, Elizabeth Purchase, and two unnamed daughters. Thomas Purchase, Jr. was reported lost at sea in 1685.

The Probate court at Lynn, Massachusetts, gives the date of Thomas Purchase's death as 1678 at 101 years old.

References

Further reading
 Brunswick Historical Society
 Pejepscot Historical Society
 History of Maine

People of colonial Maine
King Philip's War
King William's War
1577 births
1678 deaths
People from Dorchester, Dorset
English emigrants to the United States
Pejepscot, Maine